Red Snow was a British thermonuclear weapon, based on the US W28 (then called Mark 28) design used in the B28 thermonuclear bomb and AGM-28 Hound Dog missile.

Development
The Red Snow warhead was developed after a September 1958 decision to adopt the US warhead for British use, following the 1958 US-UK Mutual Defence Agreement. It entered service in 1961, remaining in use until 1972, when it was replaced by the WE.177 bomb. Production numbers are classified, but it is believed that less than 150 weapons were produced.

Red Snow was used as both a free-fall bomb and as the warhead of the Blue Steel missile. In the gravity bomb role, it was fitted into the casing of the Yellow Sun weapon, even though the Red Snow warhead was considerably smaller than that of the original Yellow Sun bomb.

The Red Snow physics package was later reduced in size, weight and yield, and fitted with a smaller more modern primary, intended as a Red Beard replacement. Known as Una, this was later reduced in diameter and renamed Ulysses as the physics package intended for the UK warhead on the Skybolt project.

Design
Red Snow used the primary stage Peter, an anglicised version of the US Python device used in the W28.

The device was fitted inside weapon cases from the older Yellow Sun weapons. This may have been to simplify crew retraining, simplify integration of the new weapon to existing platforms, or to hide the radical reduction in weapon size.

See also
 Atomic Weapons Establishment
 Rainbow Codes

References

Cold War weapons of the United Kingdom
Nuclear bombs of the United Kingdom
Military equipment introduced in the 1960s